The Battle of Montebello was fought on 20 May 1859 at Montebello (in what is now Lombardy, northern Italy). It was a minor engagement of the Second Italian War of Independence, fought between Piedmontese cavalry and French infantry against Austrian troops. Because of this battle, the Austrian commander-in-chief was obliged to keep some troops to cover the southern part of the front.

Prelude
Feldzeugmeister Ferenc Gyulay, commanding the Austrian 2nd Army, deployed VII Korps along the Sesia, the II and III Korps at Mortara, VIII Korps at Pavia, and V Korps between Pavia and Mortara.
Gyulay anticipated a Franco-Piedmontese offensive consisting of a flanking maneuver south of the Po.  Marshal Achille Baraguey d'Hilliers' I Corps advanced from Voghera, while Garibaldi advanced from the north. Gyulai assumed they were pressuring his flanks in a manoeuvre sur la derriére.

Battle
General Karl von Urban's IX Korps and Stadion's V Korps moved to stop the French offensive. On 20 May, in the first battle of the war, Forey's division, accompanied by three Piedmontese cavalry regiments commanded by General de Sonnaz, engaged the IX Korps at Montebello. After three hours, failing to stop Forey, Urban withdrew.

Aftermath
On 21 May, Napoleon III received a telegraph stating, "The Austrians have attacked, on the 20th, with approximately 15,000 men the advanced posts of Marshal Baraguey d'Hilliers. They have been repulsed by Division Forey, which conducted itself admirably and liberated the village of Montbello, already famous..." Disconcerted, Gyulai deployed his corps further south.

Austrian order of battle
FML Graf Stadion, commander of V Corps
2 squadrons of 12th regiment Haller Hussars
Paumgarten division
Gaal brigade
1/1st Liccaner Grenze
Regiment 3 Erzherzog Karl, 4 battalions
Prince Alexander von Hessen brigade
4/Kaiser Jager Regt
Regiment 31 Culoz, 4 battalions
Bils Bde
2/3rd Oguliner Grenze
Regiment 47 Kinsky, 3 battalions
20 guns
 elements Boer brigade (attached)
Regiment 49, 2nd battalion
Regiment 61, 1 battalion
(9,950 infantry, 230 cavalry and 20 guns)

Urban independent division (attached)
2 squadrons of 12th regiment Haller Hussars
Schaffgottsche brigade
3rd Jager Btn
Regiment 39 Don Miguel, 1 battalion
Grenadier Btn of Regiment 59 Raineri
Sluiner Grenz, 2 companies
Braum brigade
Regiment 40 Rossbach, 3 battalions
12 guns
4 rocket launchers
(6,700 infantry, 225 cavalry and 12 guns)

Footnotes

References
 

Montebello
Montebello 1859
Montebello 1859
Montebello 1859
Montebello
1859 in Italy
1859 in the Austrian Empire
1859 in France
May 1859 events
History of Piedmont